A penumbral lunar eclipse will take place on November 9, 2049.

Visibility

Related lunar eclipses

Lunar year series

Tzolkinex 
 Preceded: Lunar eclipse of September 29, 2042

 Followed: Lunar eclipse of December 21, 2056

See also 
List of lunar eclipses and List of 21st-century lunar eclipses

Notes

External links 
 

2049-11
2049-11
2049 in science